John Morrow may refer to:

John Morrow (American football) (1933–2017), American football player
John Morrow (footballer) (born 1971), Irish footballer
John Morrow (New Mexico politician) (1865–1935), U.S. representative from New Mexico
John Morrow, Dean of the University of Auckland Faculty of Arts
John Morrow (peace activist) (1931–2009), Northern Irish peace activist
John Morrow (Virginia politician), U.S. representative from Virginia, 1805–1809
John H. Morrow (1910–2000), American diplomat
John Morrow (writer) (1930–2014), Northern Ireland short story writer and novelist
John H. Morrow Jr., American historian and professor
John Morrow, American writer and proprietor of TwoMorrows Publishing
Jack Morrow (1872–1926), Irish cartoonist and painter

See also
John Morrow Simms, Northern Irish politician
Morrow (disambiguation)